Buvuma District is a district in the Central Region of Uganda. The district is coterminous with the Buvuma Islands archipelago in Lake Victoria and does not have territory on mainland Uganda.

Location
Buvuma District is bordered by Jinja District to the north, Mayuge District to the east, Tanzania to the south, and Buikwe District to the west and northwest.

Overview
Buvuma District is made up of 52 scattered islands in the northern part of Lake Victoria. The largest island is called Buvuma, the name adopted by the new district, which was created by Act of Parliament on 1 July 2010. Before that, it was part of Mukono District. Administratively, the district is subdivided into nine administrative units:
 Bugaya Sub-county
 Busamuzi Sub-county
 Bweema Sub-county
 Nairambi Sub-county
 Buvuma Town Council
 Buwooya Sub-County
 Lwajje Sub-County
 Lubya Sub-county
 Lyabaana Sub-county

Population
In 1991, the national population census estimated the population of the district at 18,500. During the 2002 national census, the population of Buvuma District was estimated at 42,500. In the 2014 National Population and Housing Census, the population stood at 89,890.

Economic activities

The four main activities in the district are: (a) Fishing (b) Tourism (c) Logging and (d) Manufacture of charcoal. Subsistence agriculture is practiced by the inhabitants of the islands. The majority of the islanders depend a lot on fishing. Overfishing is a concern. The district has twenty-six gazetted forest reserves, although many are threatened by unregulated logging and burning to make charcoal. Little livestock farming is practiced in the district, with the majority of livestock consumed locally in the district.

See also
 Districts of Uganda

References

 
Districts of Uganda
Central Region, Uganda
Lake Victoria
Districts in Uganda